Enterprise Electronics Corporation or EEC is an Alabama-based commercial weather radar system company, founded in 1971. EEC has designed and manufactured over 1,000 weather radar systems to over 90 countries.  EEC offers S Band, C Band, and X Band options commercially.  In 2013, EEC expanded its product line offering by acquiring the weather satellite ground station division from the Australia-based Environmental Systems & Services Pty Ltd company (ES&S).

History
Founded by a group of radar engineers in 1971, EEC made its public debut in 1974, when production of cavity magnetron and klystron commercial S and C-Band weather radars began. Also in 1974, EEC was selected by the US National Weather Service to deliver 160 WSR-74 radar systems to replace the older models across the country.  Following this, EEC expanded its operations, becoming a commonly consulted private radar company for media radars. Today, EEC is the only commercial weather radar vendor in the US to offer a complete line of magnetron, klystron and solid-state transmitter weather radar systems.

Additionally, EEC's TeleSpace business division offers direct readout ground station systems, which support the full constellation of both Geostationary Orbit and Polar Orbit weather satellites. In 2016-2017, EEC's TeleSpace division delivered the first-ever commercial GOES-16 ground station (Capella-GR) systems into North, Central, and South America.

Innovations
EEC, given frequent use by commercial media corporations, has had several instances of innovation within the company.
 1974 – First commercial weather radar on the market (WSR-100)
 1974 – First Digital Video Integrator Processor (DVIP)
 1980 – First Digital signal processor
 1981 – First commercial Doppler weather radar delivered to a TV station (KWTV-DT in Oklahoma City, OK)
 1988 – First Personal Computer-based radar display system unveiled
 2012 – First commercially available solid-state X-Band radar system unveiled
 2014 – First operational Circular Depolarization Ratio (CDR) solution unveiled
 2016 – First operational deployment of mobile, solid-state, dual-polarization X-Band radars to a TV station/network of stations in the US
 2018 – First commercial weather radar systems provider to win a Technology & Engineering Emmy Award for television in the US (StormRanger)

External links

References

Meteorological companies
Companies based in Enterprise, Alabama
Electronics companies established in 1971
American companies established in 1971